Uranotaenia moultoni is a species of mosquito in the genus Uranotaenia.  It is endemic to Sabah, Malaysian Borneo. U. moultoni is placed in the subgenus Pseudoficalbia.  In its larval stage, U. moultoni develops in the pitchers of Nepenthes species. As such, it is considered a nepenthebiont.

References

 Two New Mosquito Species from a Pitcher Plant of Mt. Kinabalu, Sabah, Malaysia
 Clarke, C.M. 1997. Nepenthes of Borneo.  Natural History Publications (Borneo), Kota Kinabalu, p. 39.

Uranotaenia
Insects described in 1914
Nepenthes infauna
Taxa named by Frederick Wallace Edwards